Mikko Pekka Johannes Kinnunen (born 16 July 1967 in Merijärvi) is a Finnish politician currently serving in the Parliament of Finland for the Centre Party at the Oulu constituency.

References

1967 births
Living people
People from Merijärvi
20th-century Finnish Lutheran clergy
Centre Party (Finland) politicians
Members of the Parliament of Finland (2019–23)
21st-century Finnish Lutheran clergy